Diwan Bahadur Raghunatha Rao Ramachandra Rao (c. 1871 – July 1936) was an Indian civil servant, mathematician and social and political activist who served as District Collector in British India.

Early life and education 

Ramachandra Rao was born in an aristocratic Thanjavur Marathi Deshastha Brahmin family in 1871. He had his schooling in Trivandrum and graduated from the Presidency College, Madras.

Career 

Rao entered the Indian Civil Service in 1890 at the age of nineteen. He served as Assistant Collector and Magistrate from 1890 to 1891 and as an official in the Revenue Department from 1891 to 1892. Rao became Deputy Collector in 1892 and Sub Collector in 1898.  In 1901, Rao was appointed District Collector of Kurnool and served till 1907. He served as Registrar of Cooperative Societies from 1907 to 1910. From 1910 to 1914, Rao served as District Collector of Nellore and in the Indian Public Services Commission from 4 to 20 January 1914. Rao retired as District Collector of Madras in 1926.

Later years and death 

After his retirement, Rao devoted his time to social and political activities. He organised an All India Exhibition in Madras during the 1927 Indian National Congress session. Rao always wore Swadeshi clothes and was a close associate of C. Rajagopalachari.

Ramachandra Rao suffered a paralytic stroke in 1930. Following the stroke, Ramachandra Rao was confined to his bed. He died in July 1936 at the age of 65.

Other interests 
Ramachandra Rao was a keen mathematician and astronomer and served as President of the Indian Mathematical Society. He was president of the Indian Mathematical Society from 1915-17. He assisted mathematician Srinivasa Ramanujan when he was jobless and got him a clerk's job at the Madras Port Trust.

In popular culture

In the Tamil biographical film Ramanujan (2014), actor Sarath Babu played the character Diwan Bahadur R. Ramachandra Rao ICS. The movie itself was based on the life of renowned Indian mathematician Srinivasa Ramanujan.

References 

 

1871 births
1936 deaths
Presidency College, Chennai alumni
People from Thanjavur district
Indian civil servants
19th-century Indian mathematicians
Presidents of the Indian Mathematical Society
Dewan Bahadurs
20th-century Indian mathematicians
Scientists from Tamil Nadu